Amblygonia is a synonym of the moth genus Parcella Stichel, 1910 of the family Noctuidae. It is listed as a genus on Butterflies and Moths of the World.

The Global Lepidoptera Names Index also lists it as a synonym of Juncaria Walker, 1858 of the family Erebidae.

References

Catocalinae
Noctuoidea genera